Severo-Yeniseysky District is an administrative and municipal district (raion), one of the forty-three in Krasnoyarsk Krai, Russia. It is located in the center of the krai and borders with Evenkiysky District in the northwest, north, and east, Motyginsky District in the southeast, and with Yeniseysky District in the southwest and west. Its administrative center is the urban locality (an urban-type settlement) of Severo-Yeniseysky. Population:  11,077 (2002 Census);  The population of the administrative center accounts for 62.5% of the district's total population.

History
The district was founded on April 1, 1932.

Government
As of 2013, the Head of the district and the Chairman of the District Council is Ishmurat M. Gaynutdinov.

References

Notes

Sources

Districts of Krasnoyarsk Krai
States and territories established in 1932